Jacques Gerard Lemaire (born September 7, 1945) is a  Canadian former ice hockey forward and head coach who was inducted into the Hockey Hall of Fame in 1984. He spent his entire twelve-year National Hockey League (NHL) playing career with the Montreal Canadiens (1967–1979) and was a part of eight Stanley Cup championship teams in 1968, 1969, 1971, 1973, 1976, 1977, 1978 and 1979. In 2017, Lemaire was named one of the "100 Greatest NHL Players".

Lemaire was a NHL head coach for seventeen seasons with the Canadiens (1983–1985), New Jersey Devils (1993–1998, 2009–2011) and Minnesota Wild (2000–2009). One of 22 coaches with 600 wins, Lemaire led the Devils to their first Stanley Cup in the 1994–95 season.

After retiring at the end of the 2010–11 NHL season, Lemaire accepted a position as special assignment coach for the Devils. He currently works as a special assignment coach for the New York Islanders, a position he previously held with the Toronto Maple Leafs.

Career

Playing career
Lemaire is one of only six NHL players to have scored two Stanley Cup-winning goals, achieving the feat in both 1977 and 1979 (The five other players are Mike Bossy in 1982 and 1983, Bobby Orr in 1970 and 1972, Henri Richard in 1966 and 1971, Jean Béliveau in 1960 and 1965 and Toe Blake in 1944 and 1946). One of the two Cup-winners scored by Lemaire came at the 4:32 mark of the first overtime of Game Four in the 1977 Stanley Cup Finals. A model of consistency, Lemaire scored at least 20 goals in each of his 12 seasons.  He retired from the NHL after the 1978–79 season to become a playing coach in Switzerland. In 853 career NHL games, he recorded 366 goals and 469 assists for a total of 835 points. Lemaire learned to execute his slapshot when he was young using a heavy steel puck, making his shot second only to that of Bobby Hull for speed and accuracy. In his bestselling book The Game former Montreal goalie Ken Dryden described a magical relationship on ice that was developing between Lemaire and Guy Lafleur, who complemented each other's speed and shotsmanship.

Lemaire's NHL playing career ended following the 1978–79 season when he surprisingly rejected the Canadiens' contract extension offer of $225,000 for each of five years.

Coaching career
Instead, Lemaire signed a three-year contract as player, coach and general manager of HC Sierre on June 15, 1979. He was paid $75,000 tax-free annually and had absolute control over his contract. "I always wanted to do something reckless, have an adventure, see how other people live, discover something new. Well, that time is now. I've always been interested in coaching, and when this opportunity presented itself, it seemed like the perfect thing," he explained.

He made his North American coaching debut in 1981, serving as an assistant coach at SUNY Plattsburgh to future NHL scout Herb Hammond at the NCAA Division III level. Lemaire was head coach of the Canadiens from 1983–1985 and the New Jersey Devils from 1993 to 1998, winning the Stanley Cup in 1995 for the 11th time, and the Jack Adams Award in 1994 and 2003. Lemaire was head coach of the Minnesota Wild from June 19, 2000 until April 11, 2009, the first head coach of the organization. He also won two more Stanley Cups as assistant general manager with Montreal in 1986 and 1993.

Lemaire is known for his unorthodox coaching style for several reasons: first, he prefers a defensive-minded system, often using a strategy called the neutral zone trap. Second, Lemaire rarely uses permanent lines preferring to use mixed line combinations during games. Third, Lemaire never employed a permanent team captain during his tenure with the Wild, opting to rotate it on a monthly basis amongst the players. Lemaire is also regarded as one of the best teaching coaches – developing young players while working well with veterans. However his emphasis on "defense first" has often been controversial, both inside and outside the dressing room. This, perhaps, has led to some conflict with star players like Marian Gaborik (formerly with the Wild) and media criticism. An example was provided by Terry Frei of ESPN.com in an article posted on August 4, 2008:

He [Lemaire] helped drag down the entertainment quotient in this league, and despite all the talk about the Wild being a skating team that uses speed and pounces on turnovers, not all the elements of the trap have disappeared from Minnesota's game. You'd think the State of Hockey is going to tire of that at some point, especially if the Wild slide this season and it drives Marian Gaborik away next summer.

On one occasion, Lemaire's team was among the top two scoring teams in the NHL. In 1993–1994, the New Jersey Devils team scored the second most goals in the league (306).

In June 2009, Lemaire was named assistant coach of Team Canada for the 2010 Winter Olympics in Vancouver, British Columbia. He joined Lindy Ruff and Ken Hitchcock as assistants to head coach Mike Babcock and helped Team Canada to the gold medal.

On July 13, 2009, exactly two years after Brent Sutter had been introduced as coach of the Devils, Lemaire returned to the head coaching position for the Devils.

On October 8, 2009, Lemaire got his 200th win with the New Jersey Devils and first of the 2009–10 NHL season.

Lemaire announced his retirement as a head coach in the NHL on April 26, 2010. However, on December 23, 2010, after Devils head coach John MacLean was fired after 33 games, Lemaire came out of retirement to coach once again for the Devils and led a charge that took the team from the bottom of league standings into contention for a playoff position before fading in the final few weeks.

On February 10, 2011, Lemaire achieved his 600th regular-season win after Ilya Kovalchuk scored in overtime to win the game for New Jersey against Toronto 2 – 1. Lemaire became only the eighth coach in NHL history to achieve this feat.

On April 10, 2011 Lemaire announced his permanent retirement from the Devils.

On August 14, 2015, the Toronto Maple Leafs announced they had hired Lemaire as a special assignment coach.

On September 14, 2018, Lemaire would follow  Lou Lamoriello to the New York Islanders, assuming the role of Special Assignment Coach.

Trivia
Lemaire is the uncle of former Stars, Wild, and Bruins goaltender Manny Fernandez.

There is a hockey arena in LaSalle, Quebec named after Lemaire.

Career statistics

Regular season and playoffs

Coaching record

See also
 List of NHL head coaches
 Notable families in the NHL

References

External links

1945 births
Living people
Canadian ice hockey coaches
Canadian ice hockey centres
French Quebecers
Hockey Hall of Fame inductees
Houston Apollos players
Ice hockey people from Montreal
Jack Adams Award winners
Longueuil Chevaliers coaches
Minnesota Wild coaches
Montreal Canadiens coaches
Montreal Canadiens executives
Montreal Canadiens players
Montreal Junior Canadiens players
New Jersey Devils coaches
People from LaSalle, Quebec
Quebec Aces (AHL) players
Stanley Cup champions
Stanley Cup championship-winning head coaches
Toronto Maple Leafs coaches
New York Islanders coaches